Norm Wilson (4 February 1927 – 14 September 2011) was a former Australian rules footballer who played with Melbourne in the Victorian Football League (VFL).

Notes

External links 

1927 births
2011 deaths
Australian rules footballers from Victoria (Australia)
Melbourne Football Club players